Bastien Tronchon (born 29 March 2002) is a French cyclist, who currently rides for UCI WorldTeam .

Major results
2019
 6th Overall Aubel–Thimister–Stavelot
1st Stage 2a (TTT)
2020
 2nd Road race, National Junior Road Championships
 10th Overall La Philippe Gilbert juniors
2021
 6th Overall Circuit des Ardennes
1st Mountains classification
2022
 1st Stage 3 Vuelta a Burgos

References

External links

2002 births
Living people
French male cyclists
Sportspeople from Chambéry
21st-century French people